The Roland Alpha Juno series of discontinued keyboards are analog polyphonic synthesizers with a digitally controlled oscillator manufactured by Roland Corporation from 1985 to 1987.

Versions
Two models were released in 1985: the Alpha Juno 1 (JU-1), and the Alpha Juno 2 (JU-2), which added one octave of notes, a cartridge slot and touch-sensitivity.

Alpha Juno synthesizers presented a reduced user interface compared to other synths of the day, with a single "Alpha Dial" replacing many sliders and knobs - they represented Roland's first truly "knobless" synthesizers since arch rivals Korg and Yamaha having already made the change to a largely pushbutton programming interface some two years before with the Poly-61 and DX7, respectively.  The keyboard features MIDI in, out and thru, mono, stereo and headphone sockets. It also supports an external footpedal controller, and tape backup. The Alpha Juno offered a combination of frequency stability (using digitally controlled oscillators) with more "organic" quality of analog filters. 

The Roland programmer PG-300 offers complete control over all MIDI editable parameters of the Alpha Juno, the Alpha Juno 2 and the MKS-50. More recently, software has been written for Microsoft Windows and Apple computers which allows graphical editing of Juno patches through MIDI.

The MKS-50 (1987) is a rack-mount version of the Alpha Juno. It has the same synth engine and architecture, with some added features like 16 programmable chord memories, and the ability to store velocity, volume, panning, de-tune, portamento and other similar parameters within each patch.

Both Alpha Junos can create the "Hoover sound" popular in jungle and rave music. Artists who have used the Alpha Juno include the Prodigy, hardcore/gabber music from the Thunderdome albums, Son Dexter and a great many other rave acts. The bassline on Madonna's Vogue was an MKS-50.

Factory presets 
The factory presets for the Alpha Juno were created by Eric Persing and Adrian Scott.

References

External links
 ROLAND SYNTH CHRONICLE:1973 - 2014
 MKS-50 / ALPHA JUNO / HS HOMEPAGE - A Website Dedicated To The MKS-50 / Alpha Juno-1 / Alpha Juno-2 / HS-10 / HS-80 Synths - Tones, Utilities, Info, DIY's, Reference Materials
 Alpha Juno 1 entry in Vintage Synth Explorer
  Alpha Juno layered to create Mellotron effect
 Sound clips, pictures and information on J-1
 New patches from AnalogAudio1

Alpha Juno
Monophonic synthesizers
Analog synthesizers
Musical instruments invented in the 1980s